This is a list of mayors and chairmen of the City of Hawthorn, a former local government area in  Melbourne, Victoria, Australia and its precedents. It existed from 1856 until 1994 when it merged with the City of Kew and the City of Camberwell to form the new City of Boroondara.

Council name

Hawthorn Municipality chairmen (1860–1863)

Hawthorn mayors (1863–1994)

See also

 List of Mayors of Boroondara (from 1996)

References 
 Big Wigs of Hawthorn, Hawthorn Historical Society (2013)

Hawthorn
Mayors Hawthorn